The Gibson County Fairgrounds are located along Embree Street across from Lafayette Park and across an intersection from Princeton Community High School in Princeton, Indiana.

The fairgrounds are the site of Indiana's oldest continuously running county fair, started in 1852, the same year as the Indiana State Fair.

References

Fairgrounds in the United States
Buildings and structures in Gibson County, Indiana
Tourist attractions in Gibson County, Indiana